This is a list of electoral divisions and wards in the ceremonial county of Staffordshire in the West Midlands. All changes since the re-organisation of local government following the passing of the Local Government Act 1972 are shown. The number of councillors elected for each electoral division or ward is shown in brackets.

County council

Staffordshire
Electoral Divisions from 1 April 1974 (first election 12 April 1973) to 7 May 1981:

Electoral Divisions from 7 May 1981 to 5 May 2005:

Electoral Divisions from 5 May 2005 to 2 May 2013:

Electoral Divisions from 2 May 2013 to present:

Unitary authority council

Stoke-on-Trent
Wards from 1 April 1974 (first election 7 June 1973) to 3 May 1979:

Wards from 3 May 1979 to 2 May 2002:

Wards from 2 May 2002 to 5 May 2011:

Wards from 5 May 2011 to present:

District councils

Cannock Chase
Wards from 1 April 1974 (first election 7 June 1973) to 6 May 1976:

Wards from 6 May 1976 to 2 May 2002:

Wards from 2 May 2002 to present:

East Staffordshire
Wards from 1 April 1974 (first election 7 June 1973) to 3 May 1979:

Wards from 3 May 1979 to 1 May 2003:

Wards from 1 May 2003 to 2023:

Wards from 2023:

Lichfield
Wards from 1 April 1974 (first election 7 June 1973) to 3 May 1979:

Wards from 3 May 1979 to 1 May 2003:

Wards from 1 May 2003 to 7 May 2015:

Wards from 7 May 2015 to present:

Newcastle-under-Lyme
Wards from 1 April 1974 (first election 7 June 1973) to 3 May 1979:

Wards from 3 May 1979 to 2 May 2002:

Wards from 2 May 2002 to 3 May 2018:

Wards from 3 May 2018 to present:

South Staffordshire
Wards from 1 April 1974 (first election 7 June 1973) to 3 May 1979:

Wards from 3 May 1979 to 2 May 1991:

Wards from 2 May 1991 to 1 May 2003:

Wards from 1 May 2003 to present:

Stafford
Wards from 1 April 1974 (first election 7 June 1973) to 3 May 1979:

Wards from 3 May 1979 to 1 May 2003:

Wards from 1 May 2003 to 7 May 2015:

Wards from 7 May 2015 to present:

Staffordshire Moorlands
Wards from 1 April 1974 (first election 7 June 1973) to 6 May 1976:

Wards from 6 May 1976 to 1 May 2003:

Wards from 1 May 2003 to present:

Tamworth
Wards from 1 April 1974 (first election 7 June 1973) to 6 May 1976:

Wards from 6 May 1976 to 2 May 2002:

Wards from 2 May 2002 to present:

Electoral wards by constituency

Burton
Abbey, Anglesey, Branston, Brizlincote, Burton, Churnet, Crown, Eton Park, Heath, Horninglow, Rolleston on Dove, Shobnall, Stapenhill, Stretton, Town, Tutbury and Outwoods, Weaver, Winshill.

Cannock Chase
Brereton and Ravenhill, Cannock East, Cannock North, Cannock South, Cannock West, Etching Hill and The Heath, Hagley, Hawks Green, Heath Hayes East and Wimblebury, Hednesford Green Heath, Hednesford North, Hednesford South, Norton Canes, Rawnsley, Western Springs.

Lichfield
All Saints, Alrewas and Fradley, Armitage with Handsacre, Bagots, Boley Park, Boney Hay, Burntwood Central, Chadsmead, Chase Terrace, Chasetown, Colton and Mavesyn Ridware, Curborough, Hammerwich, Highfield, King's Bromley, Leomansley, Longdon, Needwood, St John's, Stowe, Summerfield, Whittington, Yoxall.

Newcastle-under-Lyme
Audley and Bignall End, Bradwell, Chesterton, Clayton, Cross Heath, Halmerend, Holditch, Keele, Knutton and Silverdale, May Bank, Porthill, Seabridge, Silverdale and Parksite, Thistleberry, Town, Westlands, Wolstanton.

South Staffordshire
Bilbrook, Brewood and Coven, Cheslyn Hay North and Saredon, Cheslyn Hay South, Codsall North, Codsall South, Essington,
Featherstone and Shareshill, Great Wyrley Landywood, Great Wyrley Town, Himley and Swindon, Huntington and Hatherton, Kinver, Pattingham and Patshull, Perton Dippons, Perton East, Perton Lakeside, Trysull and Seisdon, Wombourne North and Lower Penn, Wombourne South East, Wombourne South West.

Stafford
Baswich, Common, Coton, Forebridge, Haywood and Hixon, Highfields and Western Downs, Holmcroft, Littleworth, Manor, Milford, Penkridge North East and Acton Trussell, Penkridge South East, Penkridge West, Penkside, Rowley, Seighford, Tillington, Weeping Cross, Wheaton Aston, Bishopswood and Lapley.

Staffordshire Moorlands
Alton, Bagnall and Stanley, Biddulph East, Biddulph Moor, Biddulph North, Biddulph South, Biddulph West, Brown Edge and Endon, Caverswall, Cellarhead, Cheddleton, Churnet, Dane, Hamps Valley, Horton, Ipstones, Leek East, Leek North, Leek South, Leek West, Manifold, Werrington.

Stoke-on-Trent Central
Abbey Green, Bentilee and Townsend, Berryhill and Hanley East, Hanley West and Shelton, Hartshill and Penkhull, Northwood and Birches Head, Stoke and Trent Vale.

Stoke-on-Trent North
Burslem North, Burslem South, Butt Lane, Chell and Packmoor, East Valley, Kidsgrove, Norton and Bradeley, Ravenscliffe, Talke, Tunstall.

Stoke-on-Trent South
Blurton, Fenton, Longton North, Longton South, Meir Park and Sandon, Trentham and Hanford, Weston and Meir North.

Stone
Barlaston and Oulton, Chartley, Cheadle North East, Cheadle South East, Cheadle West, Checkley, Church Eaton, Eccleshall, Forsbrook, Fulford, Gnosall and Woodseaves, Loggerheads and Whitmore, Madeley, Milwich, St Michael's, Stonefield and Christchurch, Swynnerton, Walton.

Tamworth
Amington, Belgrave, Bolehall, Bourne Vale, Castle, Fazeley, Glascote, Little Aston, Mease and Tame, Mercian, Shenstone, Spital, Stonnall, Stonydelph, Trinity, Wilnecote.

See also
List of parliamentary constituencies in Staffordshire

References

 
Staffordshire